Nanoa is a sister genus of Pimoa, in the spider family Pimoidae, containing the single species Nanoa enana.

Etymology
Combined from Greek nanos "dwarf" and the ending -oa, which follows the other pimoid genera Pimoa and Weintrauboa. The name enana of the only species means "dwarf" in Spanish.

Description
N. enana is the smallest known pimoid species, with a total body length of only 1.5 mm.

Distribution
N. enana occurs in northern California and southern Oregon.

References

Pimoidae
Monotypic Araneomorphae genera
Spiders of the United States